The Gaylactic Spectrum Awards are given to works of science fiction, fantasy and horror that explore LGBT (lesbian, gay,  bisexual or transgender) topics in  a positive way. They were founded in 1998, first presented by the Gaylactic Network in 1999, and in 2002 they were given their own organization, the Gaylactic Spectrum Awards Foundation.

Awards are given in categories for novels, short fiction and best other work, although in some years the award for short fiction has not been presented due to lack of sufficient nominees or no nominee of high enough quality. Other categories have also been added and removed in intervening years, and works produced before the inception of the awards are eligible to be inducted into the "Hall of Fame". The short fiction category is open to submissions of short written works released during the prior calendar year in North America that includes "significant positive GLBT content". The long list of nominees is reduced to a short list of finalists, and the results are generally announced and presented at Gaylaxicon, a convention dedicated to LGBT science fiction, although they have also been presented at Worldcon in the past.
This article lists all the "Best short fiction" award nominees and winners, and short fiction hall of fame inductees.

Each award consists of an etched image on lucite on a stand, using a spiral galaxy in a triangle logo, which is based on the logo the Gaylactic Network. The award winner's name, work title, award year and award category are etched on a small plaque on the base or on the plexiglass itself. A small cash stipend is awarded to winners in the Best Short Fiction category. The cost of the awards is paid for through individual donations and fundraising events.

Steve Berman has the record for most nominations, having been a finalist four times without winning. No writer has won the short fiction award more than once. Per Locus, the most recent short fiction award was given in 2010.

Winners and nominees

In the following table, the years correspond to the year of the award ceremonies; the books were released in the preceding years. Entries with a lavender background have won the relevant award; those with a white background are the finalist nominees. Superscript letters after the result indicate simultaneous nominations in other categories.

 Short fiction was part of other works this year.

Short fiction Hall of Fame inductees
In the following table, the years correspond to the year of the award ceremonies; the works were all first published before the founding of the awards in 1998. As of 2008, one short story has been inducted into the Hall of Fame:

See also

 Homosexuality in speculative fiction
 Lambda Literary Awards winners and nominees for science fiction, fantasy and horror
 Gaylactic Spectrum Award winners and nominees for best novel
 Gaylactic Spectrum Award winners and nominees for best other work

References
General
 
 

Specific

External links
The Gaylactic Spectrum Awards official site

Best Short Fiction
Lists of LGBT-related award winners and nominees
Lists of speculative fiction-related award winners and nominees